Sangeeta Krishnasamy is a Malaysian actress and model. She did a small role in Kollywood movie after making an appearance in Venkat Prabhu's hit Goa and as the female lead in ZHA among famous South Indian film actors. In 2015 she was the female lead for two hit Malaysian Tamil movies Vetti Pasanga & Vennira Iravugal. Vennira Iravugal became an acclaimed Malaysian Tamil movie after it was screened in several film festivals around Europe and won a special jury award at the Norway Tamil Film Festival in 2014, subsequently taking home all 5 awards in all categories at the Malaysian Kalai Ulagam Awards in 2015. She is amongst the top actresses in the Malaysian Film Industry.

She won awards at the Malaysian Kalai Ulagam Award 2015 for Best Actress in Movie and Telemovie category. The FFM 29 Best Film, Adiwiraku earned her the Best Actress of 2017 award, and marked her first venture into mainstream Malaysian cinema, and despite being a newcomer and her first film in the Malay language, she made it to the top five of the Best Actress category and subsequently also won at Anugerah Skrin and The Kuala Lumpur Film Critics Award, making her not only the first Indian but also the first actress to win all three in the same year.

Sangeeta Krishnasamy is a Malaysian Indian. She was born in Kuala Lumpur and studied law at the University of London, she started her career as a model while studying when she was offered to model for Nikon's online campaign, she speaks Tamil, Malay, and English fluently.

Filmography

Film

Television

Hosting and Emcee

TVC
  L’Oreal Hair Asia Pacific Malaysia 
 NTV7 Stars of Diwali 
 Nikon ambassador web 
 Tourism Malaysia 2010-2012
 Swami Sivananda Hair Oil
 Hari Pahlawan Kerinduan 
 SPS Jewelries Nilai Ambassador

Awards and nominations

See also
 Malaysian Tamil Cinema
 Vennira Iravuggal

References

External links
 

Living people
People from Kuala Lumpur
Malaysian film actresses
Malaysian television actresses
Malaysian people of Indian descent
Malaysian people of Tamil descent
Malaysian female models
Alumni of the University of London
Malaysian television personalities
Malaysian expatriate actresses in India
Actresses in Tamil cinema
21st-century Malaysian actresses
Year of birth missing (living people)